Yours – Forever More is the debut album of the Scottish progressive rock group Forever More. Recorded in 1969, it was released as a vinyl album in 1970. It was produced by Simon Napier-Bell and Ray Singer. It features future The Average White Band members Onnie McIntyre and Alan Gorrie.

Many of the album's songs can be heard in the film Permissive, in which the band appear as actors.

Track listing
Side 1
"Back in the States Again" - (Mick Travis) - 2:47
"We Sing" - (Sam Hedd) - 4:10
"It's Home" - (Mick Travis) - 1:36
"Home Country Blues" - (Mick Travis) - 2:55
"Good to Me" - (Sam Hedd) - 8:00

Side 2
"Yours" - (Alan Gorrie) - 2:10
"Beautiful Afternoon" - (Sam Hedd) - 2:19
"8 O'Clock & All's Well" - (Sam Hedd) - 3:20
"Mean Pappie Blues" - (Mick Travis) - 1:36
"You Too Can Have a Body Like Mine" - (Sam Hedd) - 2:42
"Sylvester's Last Voyage" - (Alan Gorrie) - 3:39

Personnel
Alan Gorrie - bass, lead (1, 4, 6-8, 11) and backing vocals, piano, teapot percussion
Mick Travis - guitar, lead (2, 3, 5, 9, 10) and backing vocals
Onnie McIntyre - guitar, backing vocals, bass
Stuart Francis - drums, backing vocals

References

1970 debut albums
Forever More (band) albums
RCA Victor albums